Govind Rao Gaekwad (? – 19 September 1800) was the Maharaja of Baroda (r.1793 - 1800). He was the fourth son of Damaji Rao Gaekwad.

See also
Gaekwad dynasty

References

External links
 Official Website of the Gaekwads of Baroda 

1800 deaths
Maharajas of Vadodara
Year of birth unknown
Hindu monarchs
Indian royalty
Indian military leaders